Cesare Ventimiglia or Caesar Vintirailius (1573 – 23 December 1645) was a Roman Catholic prelate who served as Bishop of Terracina, Priverno e Sezze (1615–1645).

Biography
Cesare Ventimiglia was born in Benevento, Italy in 1573 and ordained a priest on 31 December 1614.
On 12 January 1615, he was appointed during the papacy of Pope Paul V as Bishop of Terracina, Priverno e Sezze.
On 25 March 1615, he was consecrated bishop by Bonifazio Caetani, Archbishop of Taranto, with Ascanio Gesualdo, Archbishop of Bari, and Pietro Francesco Montorio, Bishop of Nicastro, serving as co-consecrators. 
He served as Bishop of Terracina, Priverno e Sezze until his death on 23 December 1645.

Episcopal succession
While bishop, he was the principal co-consecrator of:
García Gil Manrique, Auxiliary Bishop of Cuenca (1618);
Benedetto Baaz, Bishop of Umbriatico (1622);
Cesare Gherardi, Bishop of Camerino (1622);
Sebastiano De Paoli, Coadjutor Bishop of Nepi e Sutri (1622); and
Alvaro Mendoza, Bishop of L'Aquila (1622).

References

External links and additional sources
 (for Chronology of Bishops) 
 (for Chronology of Bishops) 

17th-century Italian Roman Catholic bishops
Bishops appointed by Pope Paul V
1573 births
1645 deaths